Aline Koala Kaboré is a diplomat from Burkina Faso who served as Ambassador to Senegal, having presented her credentials on March 29, 2013.  She served until December 19, 2017.

References

Burkinabé women ambassadors
Ambassadors of Burkina Faso to Senegal
Year of birth missing (living people)
Living people
21st-century Burkinabé people